Randy Stewart (born October 28, 1951) is an American sports shooter. He competed in the men's 50 metre running target event at the 1984 Summer Olympics.

References

External links
 

1951 births
Living people
American male sport shooters
Olympic shooters of the United States
Shooters at the 1984 Summer Olympics
People from Nashville, Arkansas
Pan American Games medalists in shooting
Pan American Games silver medalists for the United States
Shooters at the 1983 Pan American Games
Medalists at the 1983 Pan American Games